The Third Republic Party is an Armenian political party. It was founded in 2016 and is currently led by Viktor Dallakyan.

History
The Third Republic Party was founded on 28 November 2016. In 2016, Edward Antinyan stepped down as Chairman of the party and was replaced by Viktor Dallakyan, former member of the Republican Party of Armenia and former Deputy Chief of Staff of the President of Armenia.

Prior to the 2017 Armenian parliamentary election, the party announced its intentions to participate in the elections with the ORO Alliance. However, three months before the election, the party stated that it would no longer be participating in the elections and would not join the ORO Alliance.

The party does not currently maintain any representation in the National Assembly.

Ideology
The party supports promoting the economic development of the country, overcoming poverty, investing in agriculture, and alleviating unemployment. The party believes in transforming Armenia into a modern, competitive state and supports the international recognition of the Republic of Artsakh.

See also

 Programs of political parties in Armenia

References

Political parties established in 2016
Political parties in Armenia